Stefan Alvén (born 12 December 1968) is a Swedish lawyer and former footballer who played as a defender.

Honours

Club 

 Djurgårdens IF
 Division 1 Norra (1): 1994

References

External links 
 

1968 births
Living people
Association football midfielders
Swedish footballers
Allsvenskan players
Ettan Fotboll players
Landskrona BoIS players
Malmö FF players
Djurgårdens IF Fotboll players
IFK Norrköping players
Djurgårdens IF Fotboll directors and chairmen